This is a list of symphonies in D major written by notable composers.

See also

For symphonies in other keys, see List of symphonies by key.

Notes

References

Hill, George R.: "Thematic Index" in The Symphony 1720 - 1840 Series B - Volume X, ed. Barry Shelley Brook (Garland Publishing:New York & London, 1981) ISBN ?-???-?????-?

D major
Symphonies